The Springwater meteorite is a stony-iron pallasite, found near Springwater, Saskatchewan in 1931.
Other fragments have been found recently, including a  individual in 2009 that is now in the Royal Ontario Museum.

Thirty percent of the meteorite is the iron-rich metallic phases kamacite and taenite, with the rest mostly made up of olivine. There are minor amounts of other minerals, including several phosphates such as farringtonite and stanfieldite and merrillite (a member of the whitlockite group).

See also
 Glossary of meteoritics
 Meteorite find

References

Stony-iron meteorites
Meteorites found in Canada
1931 in science
1931 in Saskatchewan
Geography of Saskatchewan